Joshua Warner (born May 15, 1979) is a former American football offensive lineman. Undrafted in 2001, Warner was signed by the Chicago Bears and assigned to the Berlin Thunder. In 2003, Warner played twelve games for the Bears.

References 

1979 births
Living people
American football offensive linemen
Green Bay Packers players
Chicago Bears players
Berlin Thunder players
Brockport Golden Eagles football players